Karl Rainer (1 July 1901 – 9 June 1987) was an Austrian international footballer and coach.

References

1901 births
1987 deaths
Association football defenders
Austrian footballers
Austria international footballers
First Vienna FC players
Austrian football managers
First Vienna FC managers